David Meredith Reese (1800–1861) was an American physician and skeptic.

Reese worked as a physician at the Bellevue Hospital until 1849. He was a skeptical of the many "isms" of his day. He had heavily criticized quackery in his book Humbugs of New York (1838). He was highly critical of phrenology.

Reese's book was published several years before Extraordinary Popular Delusions and the Madness of Crowds (1841) and has been described as early debunking work.

In 1835, Reese published Letters to the Hon. William Jay. A Reply to his 'Inquiry Into The American Colonization and American Anti-Slavery Movements, in which he supports the efforts of the American Colonization Society.

Publications
 Letters to the Hon. William Jay. A Reply to his 'Inquiry Into The American Colonization and American Anti-Slavery Movements (1835)
 Phrenology Known by Its Fruits (1836)
 Humbugs of New-York: Being a Remonstrance Against Popular Delusion, Whether in Science, Philosophy, or Religion (1838)
 Medical Lexicon of Modern Terminology (1848)
 Elements of Zoology, Or, Natural History of Animals (1849)

References

1800 births
1861 deaths
19th-century American physicians
American skeptics
Critics of alternative medicine
Critics of parapsychology